The Foundation Hindu Media, Dutch: Organisatie Hindoe Media (abbr. OHM), was a special broadcaster on the Netherlands Public Broadcasting system, which was allowed to broadcast on radio and television because of their religious background. They made programming for the Dutch Hindu community.

OHM was one of the "2.42 broadcasters" (named after the Article 2.42 of the Mediawet, the Dutch media law, which allowed faith-based broadcasters to get airtime on radio and TV without having to have any members).

On January 1, 2016, the broadcasters in the NPO were reduced to eight, and the 2.42-broadcasters, including OHM, ceased to exist. NTR became responsible for producing programming for Hindu people.

External links
  Official website

Dutch public broadcasting organisations
Netherlands Public Broadcasting
Dutch-language television networks
Hindu television
Hindu radio stations
Hindu radio stations in the Netherlands
Hindu television stations in the Netherlands
Television channels and stations established in 1993